Sabrina Maneca-Voinea (born 2007) is a Romanian senior artistic gymnast. She won gold on vault at the 2022 European Junior Artistic Gymnastics Championships, silver in the team final and bronze on floor. She is coached by her mother, former Olympic gymnast Camelia Voinea.

Competitive History

References

2007 births

Living people
Romanian female artistic gymnasts